Ibrox Parish Church is a parish church of the Church of Scotland, serving the Ibrox, and to a lesser extent the Cessnock areas of Glasgow, Scotland next to the M8 motorway. The Church and parish sits within the Church of Scotland's Presbytery of Glasgow, and provides numerous activities in the local and wider community. The current minister is Rev Tara Granados.

History
The history of the church dates back to 1863 when the Kirk Session of Govan Old Parish Church made the church one of her many daughters to help serve the expanding southside of Glasgow as "Bellahouston Parish Church". The sanctuary was built using money from Moses Steven, a wealthy entrepreneur, and designed by James Smith. In 1898 the two transepts were added to the original building, making it the cruciform shape after two unions with neighbouring churches, Steven Memorial in 1969 and Ibrox in 1978. In 1978 the church name was officially changed to Ibrox Parish Church. The building is Category B listed. Over the years, there have been many alterations and upgradings to the overall building complex, including a Link Block with an office and board room between the sanctuary and the church halls.

In addition to other artistic features and church furnishings, the building had until 2009 an original French Cavaille-Coll, one of two in Scotland: the other at Paisley Abbey.

In 2002, the church was used as one of the locations for the film Man Dancin'. The church is also a distribution centre for the Glasgow South West Foodbank.

The Boys' Brigade
The church is also the home of the Boys' Brigade Glasgow Battalion's Headquarters and the 163rd Glasgow Company, a stone's throw away from Ibrox Stadium which hosted the 1983 Centenary Service.

Richmond Hope
Since September 2016, Richmond's Hope has been using the church to provide bereavement services for children to explore their feelings & find ways of coping.

See also
List of Church of Scotland parishes

References

External links
Official website
The Boys' Brigade Glasgow

Church of Scotland churches in Scotland
Ibrox
Category B listed buildings in Glasgow
Listed churches in Glasgow
Churches completed in 1898
19th-century Church of Scotland church buildings